Theory U is a change management method and the title of a book by Otto Scharmer.  Scharmer with colleagues at MIT conducted 150 interviews with entrepreneurs and innovators in science, business, and society and then extended the basic principles into a theory of learning and management, which he calls Theory U. The principles of Theory U are suggested to help political leaders, civil servants, and managers break through past unproductive patterns of behavior that prevent them from empathizing with their clients' perspectives and often lock them into ineffective patterns of decision making.

Some notes about theory U

Fields of attention
 Thinking (individual)
 Conversing (group)
 Structuring (institutions)
 Ecosystem coordination (global systems)

Presencing
The author of the theory U concept expresses it as a process or journey, which is also described as Presencing, as indicated in the diagram (for which there are numerous variants).

At the core of the "U" theory is presencing: sensing + presence. According to The Learning Exchange, Presencing is a journey with five movements:

On that journey, at the bottom of the U, lies an inner gate that requires us to drop everything that isn't essential. This process of letting-go (of our old ego and self) and letting-come (our highest future possibility: our Self) establishes a subtle connection to a deeper source of knowing. The essence of presencing is that these two selves – our current self and our best future self – meet at the bottom of the U and begin to listen and resonate with each other. Once a group crosses this threshold, nothing remains the same. Individual members and the group as a whole begin to operate with a heightened level of energy and sense of future possibility. Often they then begin to function as an intentional vehicle for an emerging future.

The core elements are shown below.

"Moving down the left side of the U is about opening up and dealing with the resistance of thought, emotion, and will; moving up the right side is about intentionally reintegrating the intelligence of the head, the heart, and the hand in the context of practical applications".

Leadership capacities
According to Scharmer, a value created by journeying through the "U" is to develop seven essential leadership capacities:
 Holding the space: listen to what life calls you to do (listen to oneself, to others and make sure that there is space where people can talk)
 Observing: Attend with your mind wide open (observe without your voice of judgment, effectively suspending past cognitive schema)
 Sensing: Connect with your heart and facilitate the opening process (i.e. see things as interconnected wholes)
 Presencing: Connect to the deepest source of your self and will and act from the emerging whole
 Crystallizing: Access the power of intention (ensure a small group of key people commits itself to the purpose and outcomes of the project)
 Prototyping: Integrating head, heart, and hand (one should act and learn by doing, avoiding the paralysis of inaction, reactive action, over-analysis, etc.)
 Performing: Playing the "macro violin" (i.e. find the right leaders, find appropriate social technology to get a multi-stakeholder project going).
The sources of Theory U include interviews with 150 innovators and thought leaders on management and change. Particularly the work of Brian Arthur, Francisco Varela, Peter Senge, Ed Schein, Joseph Jaworski, Arawana Hayashi, Eleanor Rosch, Friedrich Glasl, Martin Buber, Rudolf Steiner and Johan W. V. Goethe have been critical. Artists are represented in the project from 2001 -2010 by Andrew Campbell, whose work was given a separate index page linked to the original project site. https://web.archive.org/web/20050404033150/http://www.dialogonleadership.org/indexPaintings.html
Today, Theory U constitutes a body of leadership and management praxis drawing from a variety of sources and more than 20 years of elaboration by Scharmer and colleagues. Theory U is translated into 20 languages and is used in change processes worldwide. 

Meditation teacher Arawana Hayashi has explained how she considers Theory U relevant to "the feminine principle".

Earlier work: U-procedure
The earlier work by Glasl involved a sociotechnical, Goethean and anthroposophical process involving a few or many co-workers, managers and/or policymakers. It proceeded from phenomenological diagnosis of the present state of the organisation to plans for the future. They described a process in a U formation consisting of three levels (technical and instrumental subsystem, social subsystem and cultural subsystem) and seven stages beginning with the observation of organisational phenomena, workflows, resources etc., and concluding with specific decisions about desired future processes and phenomena. The method draws on the Goethean techniques described by Rudolf Steiner, transforming observations into intuitions and judgements about the present state of the organisation and decisions about the future. The three stages represent explicitly recursive reappraisals at progressively advanced levels of reflective, creative and intuitive insight and (epistemologies), thereby enabling more radically systemic intervention and redesign. The stages are: phenomena – picture (a qualitative metaphoric visual representation) – idea (the organising idea or formative principle) – and judgement (does this fit?). The first three then are reflexively replaced by better alternatives (new idea --> new image --> new phenomena) to form the  design design.  Glasl published the method in Dutch (1975), German (1975, 1994) and English (1997).

The seven stages are shown below.

In contrast to that earlier work on the U procedure, which assumes a set of three subsystems in the organization that need to be analyzed in a specific sequence, Theory U starts from a different epistemological view that is grounded in Varela's approach to neurophenomenology. It focuses on the process of becoming aware and applies to all levels of systems change. Theory U contributed to advancing organizational learning and systems thinking tools towards an awareness-based view of systems change that blends systems thinking with systems sensing. On the left-hand side of the U the process is going through the three main "gestures" of becoming aware that Francisco Varela spelled out in his work (suspension, redirection, letting-go). On the right-hand side of the U this process extends towards actualizing the future that is wanting to emerge (letting come, enacting, embodying).

Criticism 
Sociologist Stefan Kühl criticizes Theory U as a management fashion on three main points: First of all, while Theory U posits to create change on all levels, including the level of the individual "self" and the institutional level, case studies mainly focus on clarifying the positions of individuals in groups or teams. Except of the idea of participating in online courses on Theory U, the theory remains silent on how broad organisational or societal changes may take place. Secondly, Theory U, like many management fashions, neglects structural conflicts of interest, for instance between groups, organisations and class. While it makes sense for top management to emphasize common values, visions and the community of all staff externally, Kühl believes this to be problematic if organisations internally believe too strongly in this community, as this may prevent the articulation of conflicting interests and therefore organisational learning processes. Finally, the 5 phase model of Theory U, like other cyclical (but less esoteric) management models, such as PDCA, are a gross simplification of decision-making processes in organisation that are often wilder, less structured and more complex. Kühl argues that Theory U may be useful as it allows management to make decisions despite unsure knowledge and encourages change, but expects that Theory U will lose its glamour.

See also
 Appreciative inquiry
 Art of Hosting
 Decision cycle
 Insight dialogue
 Learning cycle
 OODA loop
 V-Model

References

External links
 C. Otto Scharmer Home Page
 Presencing Home Page
 The U-Process for Discovery

Stage theories
Change management